The Round sand-eel (Bascanichthys cylindricus) is an eel in the family Ophichthidae (worm/snake eels). It was described by Seth Eugene Meek and Samuel Frederick Hildebrand in 1923. It reaches a maximum length of around 88 cm. It is distributed throughout the Eastern Central Pacific; inhabiting shallow, sandy bottoms.

References

Ophichthidae
Fish described in 1923